Trichobaris texana is a subjective junior synonym of Trichobaris pellicea (Boheman, 1844).

References

Baridinae
Articles created by Qbugbot
Beetles described in 1876